Shaun Hollinshead (born 21 February 1961) is an English footballer who played in the Football League for Crewe Alexandra. After ending his semi-pro career he turned to management and is currently in charge of Eccleshall.

Career
Hollinshead was born in Sandbach and began his career with Crewe Alexandra. He made five appearances under manager Harry Gregg but failed to forge a career in professional football and became a foreman groundsman with Cheshire County Council and played semi-pro football with Congleton Town, Eastwood Hanley, Kidsgrove Athletic, Newcastle Town and Rhyl.

He turned to management with Congleton Vale and Alsager Town and had a successful spell with Stone Dominoes. He was appointed manager of Kidsgrove Athletic in the summer of 2012. He was sacked in April 2013.

Hollinshead was appointed manager of Eccleshall in November 2013.

References
General
 . Retrieved 16 January 2013.
Specific

1961 births
Living people
People from Sandbach
English footballers
Association football midfielders
Crewe Alexandra F.C. players
Congleton Town F.C. players
Eastwood Hanley F.C. players
Kidsgrove Athletic F.C. players
Newcastle Town F.C. players
Rhyl F.C. players
English Football League players
Kidsgrove Athletic F.C. managers
Eccleshall F.C. managers
Alsager Town F.C. managers
English football managers